Taylor Hall (born November 14, 1991) is a Canadian professional ice hockey left winger for the Boston Bruins of the National Hockey League (NHL). He was the first overall pick in the 2010 NHL Entry Draft selected by the Edmonton Oilers. He has previously played for the Oilers, New Jersey Devils, Arizona Coyotes and Buffalo Sabres.

Hall had a highly successful junior career, helping the Ontario Hockey League (OHL)'s Windsor Spitfires to two consecutive Memorial Cup championships in 2009 and 2010. He won the Stafford Smythe Memorial Trophy as the most valuable player of the Memorial Cup tournament both years. Hall has been named to the NHL All-Star Game on five occasions. In his second season with the Devils, Hall won the Hart Memorial Trophy as the NHL's most valuable player, becoming the first Devils player in franchise history to win the award.

Early life
Hall was born in Calgary, the only child of Steve Hall and Kim Strba. His father was a former Canadian Football League (CFL) player for the Winnipeg Blue Bombers, Toronto Argonauts and Ottawa Rough Riders in the mid-1980s, after which he was a member of the Canadian national bobsleigh team. His mother introduced him to organized hockey at age five while his father maintained a backyard rink every winter which Hall and his friends practiced on relentlessly. His family moved to Kingston, Ontario, in 2005, where he attended high school at Frontenac Secondary School and later attended St. Anne's Catholic High School in Tecumseh, Ontario while with the Windsor Spitfires.

Playing career

Minor
Hall started playing minor hockey in Calgary, Alberta. When he was 13, his family moved to Kingston, Ontario, where he continued to play. Hall captured a Bantam AAA Calgary city championship with the North East Canucks during the 2004–05 season. For the 2005–06 and 2006–07 seasons, Hall played Bantam and Minor Midget hockey for the Greater Kingston Predators of the ODMHA league. He was named to the ODMHA Midget AAA All-Star team. After the season, Hall was the second overall choice in the 2007 Ontario Hockey League (OHL) Priority Selection by the Windsor Spitfires. Ryan O'Reilly was selected first overall by the Erie Otters.

Junior
Hall made his OHL debut in 2007–08, scoring a team-high 45 goals and adding 39 assists for 84 points, which was third in team scoring. In March, he was named OHL Player of the Week twice (March 3 and March 10). He was named OHL and CHL Rookie of the Year after the season.

During the 2008–09 season, Hall was selected to represent the OHL in the ADT Canada-Russia Challenge. He scored 38 goals and added 52 assists to finish with 90 points. Windsor had a successful season on the ice, capturing the OHL Championship as well as the Memorial Cup. During the OHL playoffs, Hall scored 16 goals and added 20 assists while being awarded the Wayne Gretzky 99 Award as Playoff MVP. He scored the game-winning overtime goal in the fifth and deciding game of the OHL Finals against the Brampton Battalion to clinch the title. At the 2009 Memorial Cup, Hall recorded eight points in six games as the Spitfires defeated the Kelowna Rockets 4–1 in the final. After the tournament, Hall was awarded the Stafford Smythe Memorial Trophy as the tournament's most valuable player and was named to the tournament all-star team alongside teammate Ryan Ellis.

Though the odds of him playing in Russia were remote, Hall was drafted 89th overall by the Kontinental Hockey League (KHL)'s Ak Bars Kazan on June 1, 2009. He was one of three Canadian junior players (all from the OHL) taken in the 2009 KHL Draft, which begins selecting players one year younger than the NHL does. Hall was an early favourite to be the top pick in the 2010 NHL Entry Draft since entering the junior ranks. He was praised early in his junior career on Hockey Night in Canada by commentator Don Cherry during his "Coach's Corner" segment. Hall was also featured in a July 2008 issue of Sports Illustrated, profiling young athletes poised to star in their sports.

Hall finished the 2009–10 season tied for first place in the OHL with Tyler Seguin with 106 points (40 goals and 66 assists) to win the Eddie Powers Memorial Trophy alongside Seguin. Hall was instrumental in the Spitfires' 2010 J. Ross Robertson Cup championship, recording a playoff-leading 35 points in 19 playoff games. His teammate, Adam Henrique, won the Wayne Gretzky 99 Award, scoring 20 goals.

In May 2010, Hall helped lead the Spitfires to their second-straight Memorial Cup. With the victory, Hall was awarded his second-straight Stafford Smythe Memorial Trophy as tournament MVP (the first player in its history to repeat as a winner), the Ed Chynoweth Trophy as Memorial Cup scoring leader and a spot on the tournament all-star team for the second-straight year.

Hall was ranked as the top North American-based prospect by the NHL Central Scouting Bureau (CSB) in its 2009–10 midterm rankings. In the CSB's final rankings, he was overtaken by Tyler Seguin as the top-ranked North American-based prospect. Hall has cited Toronto Maple Leafs forward and 2009 NHL Entry Draft first overall pick John Tavares as a role model, both on and off the ice.

Professional

Edmonton Oilers (2010–2016)
Shortly after being selected first overall by the Edmonton Oilers in the 2010 NHL Entry Draft, Hall signed his first professional contract. The contract paid Hall the entry level maximum of $900,000 with the potential of an additional $2.85 million in performance bonuses. This was the second-most lucrative rookie contract in Oilers history.

Hall was given permission to wear the jersey number 4, which had belonged to former Oilers' player Kevin Lowe, who was then serving as the Oilers' president of hockey operations and who had been the only Oiler to wear the number 4 in its NHL history, despite the fact that Lowe's number 4 was not retired by the Oilers.

Hall made his NHL debut on October 7, 2010, as the Oilers defeated their Battle of Alberta rivals, the Calgary Flames, at Rexall Place. Hall's first NHL point, an assist, came in his second game, against the Florida Panthers on October 10; Shawn Horcoff redirected Hall's shot in front of the net. Hall's first NHL goal came on October 28 against Steve Mason of the Columbus Blue Jackets; Hall's former head coach with the Windsor Spitfires, Bob Boughner, was an assistant coach with Columbus at the time.

Hall was named to the 2011 NHL All-Star Game as a rookie; a newly-introduced format for the 2011 All-Star Game selected 12 rookies specifically to participate in the NHL All-Star Game SuperSkills Competition. Hall came in second place to Michael Grabner in the fastest skater SuperSkills Competition.

Hall scored his first career NHL hat-trick (and natural hat-trick) against the Atlanta Thrashers on February 19, 2011: with the Oilers behind by two goals, Hall scored three consecutive power play goals in a span of 12:53 as the Oilers eventually won the game 5–3.

On March 3, 2011, in a 4–2 win against the Columbus Blue Jackets, Hall recorded his first career Gordie Howe hat-trick: Hall scored a goal against Steve Mason, assisted a goal scored by Jordan Eberle and fought Derek Dorsett. However, the fight with Dorsett ended Hall's rookie season early as he suffered a high ankle sprain at the end of the fight. Hall finished his rookie season scoring 22 goals and 20 assists in 65 games.

On January 17, 2012, Hall was cut by teammate Corey Potter's skate before a game against the Columbus Blue Jackets during warmup, resulting in a deep cut to his face that required 30 stitches to close.

It was announced that Hall would need major shoulder surgery and would need five-to-six months to recover, ending his successful sophomore year. Despite missing 21 games, Hall was still tied for fifth for power play goals.

On August 21, 2012, Hall signed a new seven-year, $42 million contract with the Oilers worth an annual average value of $6 million.

On January 26, 2013, Hall recorded his 100th career point with two assists in a 4–3 loss against the Calgary Flames. On February 22, 2013, he was given a two-game suspension by the NHL after a collision with Minnesota Wilds forward Cal Clutterbuck. On March 30, 2013, in a game against the Vancouver Canucks, Hall set a new franchise record by scoring a hat-trick just 7:53 into the game. Hall finished the lockout-shortened 2012–13 season ninth in NHL regular season scoring, also recording a career-high of 34 assists, sufficient for eighth in the NHL.

On October 17, 2013, Hall broke Wayne Gretzky's previous Oilers franchise record of two goals in nine seconds by scoring two in eight. On December 5, 2013, in a 9–2 win over the Chicago Blackhawks, Hall recorded his second career NHL hat-trick, having previously gone nine games without a goal.

In 2016, Hall was named to his first NHL All-Star Game as a member of the Pacific Division team.

New Jersey Devils (2016–2019)
On June 29, 2016, Hall was traded to the New Jersey Devils in exchange for Adam Larsson. Hall chose to wear number 9 with the Devils as his usual number 4 had been retired by the team in honor of Scott Stevens. Hall scored his first goal as a Devil on October 18, 2016, against the Anaheim Ducks. He later scored another goal in the same period to secure a 2–1 win. On November 16, Hall underwent surgery for a torn meniscus in his left knee. He was expected to miss three-to-four weeks, but skated on his own a week after surgery and with the team at practice on November 28. Hall was named to the Metropolitan Division team as the lone representative of the Devils at the 2017 NHL All-Star Game.

Hall was again named to the NHL All-Star Game in the 2017–18 season. However, due to a hand injury, he was replaced by teammate Brian Boyle. On February 15, 2018, in a win over the Carolina Hurricanes, Hall set a Devils franchise record with a 16-game point streak. His point streak came to an end at 26 games on March 8 in a 3–2 loss to the Winnipeg Jets; Hall recorded two shots on goal in the game. His 26-game point streak was the longest in the NHL since Patrick Kane's 26-point streak in the 2015–16 season. Hall finished the regular season as the Devils' top scorer with a career-high 93 points (39 goals and 54 assists) as he led the Devils to their first Stanley Cup playoff appearance since 2012. It was also the first time Hall ever played in the playoffs. Hall again led the Devils in the playoffs as their top scorer with six points (two goals and four assists) as the team was eliminated in the first round by the Tampa Bay Lightning, four games to one. On April 26, Hall was nominated for the Ted Lindsay Award as the NHL's most outstanding player. The following day, on April 27, Hall was also declared a finalist for the Hart Memorial Trophy as the NHL's most valuable player. Hall won the latter, becoming the first player in Devils history to win the trophy.

Hall was named an alternate captain for the Devils prior to the 2018–19 season. On December 13, 2018, he suffered an injury during practice which forced him to miss two games. After returning to the lineup, Hall recorded his 200th NHL goal in a 2–1 loss to the Columbus Blue Jackets on December 20. However, he re-aggravated the injury on December 23 and was placed on injured reserve by the Devils on January 1, 2019. At the time, he had recorded 37 points in 33 games. Despite these injuries, Hall was selected for his fourth consecutive All-Star Game, but was later replaced by teammate Kyle Palmieri as he had not yet recovered. In February, Hall underwent arthroscopic knee surgery and entered rehabilitation.

After not playing for the rest of the 2018–19 season, Hall suited up the Devils pre-season games. In his first game back since December, Hall recorded a goal and an assist in a 4–2 win over the New York Rangers during the pre-season.

Arizona Coyotes (2019–2020)
In the final year of his contract and with the Devils standing outside the playoff picture, speculation arose that Hall was likely to be traded. On December 13, 2019, it was announced that Hall would be scratched for that day's game against the Colorado Avalanche for "precautionary reasons". Hall would again be scratched the following night against the Coyotes.

On December 16, 2019, the Devils traded Hall and Blake Speers to the Arizona Coyotes in exchange for Nick Merkley, Kevin Bahl, Nate Schnarr, a conditional first-round pick in 2020, and a conditional third-round pick in 2021.

On October 7, 2020, Coyotes general manager Bill Armstrong announced that the Coyotes would not be re-signing Taylor Hall, marking the first time in Hall's career that he would be an unrestricted free agent.

Buffalo Sabres (2020–2021)
On October 11, 2020, Hall agreed to join the Buffalo Sabres, signing a one-year, $8-million contract. In the pandemic delayed 2020–21 season, Hall struggled to show his offensive acumen, collecting just 2 goals and 19 points through 37 regular season games for the Sabres.

Boston Bruins (2021–present)
With the Sabres out of playoff contention and on the eve of the trade deadline, Hall, with his salary retained by 50%, was traded by the Sabres along with Curtis Lazar to the Boston Bruins in exchange for Anders Bjork and  a 2021 second-round draft pick on April 11, 2021. Hall scored his first goal with the Bruins on April 15, 2021. Hall chose to wear number 71 with the Bruins as his usual number 4 had been retired by the team in honor of Bobby Orr. Hall's presence as the new left-wing forward on David Krejčí's line provided an immediate boost to the Bruins' offense as the season wound down, with a total of 8 goals and 6 assists over the concluding 16 games of the 2020–21 season that he played in for the Bruins.
On May 17, 2021, Hall recorded the tying goal against the Capitals to send the Bruins to overtime in Game 2 of the first round of the Stanley Cup Playoffs.

On July 23, 2021, Hall opted to forgo free agency by agreeing to a four-year, $24 million contract extension with the Bruins.

International play

Hall represented Canada at the 2008 IIHF World U18 Championships in Kazan, Russia, as one of five 16-year-olds. He was fifth in tournament scoring, with nine points in seven games, helping Canada to a gold medal. He returned to Canada's under-18 team to earn a second gold medal at the 2008 Ivan Hlinka Memorial Tournament in Slovakia as an alternate captain to captain Matt Duchene.

Hall made Canada's national junior team roster for the 2010 World Junior Championships in Saskatchewan. He was the lone 2010 NHL Entry Draft-eligible player selected to the final roster. Hall scored a hat-trick against Slovakia in a game Canada won 8–2. Hall finished the tournament tied for third overall in scoring with teammate Alex Pietrangelo and the United States' Jerry D'Amigo; Hall finished with six goals and six assists in six games.

Hall was invited to Hockey Canada's summer evaluation camp for the 2011 World Junior Tournament, but declined to participate, choosing instead to focus on making the Edmonton Oilers' roster for the upcoming NHL season. According to Hockey Canada policy, Hall would have been ineligible to participate in the tournament even if he was available.

At the 2015 World Championships, where the senior Canadian team won the gold medal for the first time since 2007 with a perfect 10–0 record, Hall was named a member of the tournament all-star team.

Hall played at the 2016 World Championships, where Canada successfully defended their gold medal.

Career statistics

Regular season and playoffs

International

Awards and honours

References

External links

 

1991 births
Living people
Arizona Coyotes players
Boston Bruins players
Buffalo Sabres players
Canadian ice hockey left wingers
Canadian people of Australian descent
Canadian people of Slovak descent
Edmonton Oilers draft picks
Edmonton Oilers players
Hart Memorial Trophy winners
National Hockey League All-Stars
National Hockey League first-overall draft picks
National Hockey League first-round draft picks
New Jersey Devils players
Oklahoma City Barons players
Ice hockey people from Calgary
Windsor Spitfires players